Eurylaimides (Old World suboscines) is a clade of passerine birds that are distributed in tropical regions around the Indian Ocean and a single American species, the sapayoa. This group is divided into five families The families listed here are those recognised by the International Ornithologists' Union (IOC).

 Philepittidae: asities
 Eurylaimidae: typical broadbills
 Calyptomenidae: African and green broadbills
 Sapayoidae: broad-billed sapayoa
 Pittidae: pittas

Phylogenetic relationships of the Eurylaimides based on Oliveros et al. (2019):

References

Extant Eocene first appearances
Bird infraorders